Jeremy James is a figurative sculptor, working mostly in fired ceramic. Known for lively renditions of hares, cockerels, wading birds and human figures. Exhibits widely across the UK and collected by private individuals as well as national galleries and collections.

External links

English sculptors
English male sculptors
Living people
Place of birth missing (living people)
Year of birth missing (living people)